The Best of Fourplay is a compilation album by American smooth jazz quartet Fourplay, released in 1997. The 2020 SACD remastered edition of the album includes the bonus track, 'The Closer I Get To You,' a duet between Patti Austin and Peabo Bryson.

Track listing

Personnel 
As listed in the liner notes.

Fourplay 
 Bob James – keyboards
 Lee Ritenour – guitars
 Nathan East – basses, vocals (9)
 Harvey Mason – drums, percussion 

Additional personnel
 Harvey Mason Jr. – synthesizers (3)
 Dan Shea – synthesizers (12)
 Take 6 – vocals (3)
 David Thomas – lead vocals (3)
 El DeBarge – vocals (6)
 Chaka Khan – vocals (9)
 Phil Collins – vocals (12)

References

External links 
 Fourplay - The Best of Fourplay (1997) album review by Richard S. Ginell, credits & releases at AllMusic
 Fourplay - The Best of Fourplay (1997) album releases & credits at Discogs
 Fourplay - The Best of Fourplay (1997) album to be listened as stream on Spotify

Fourplay albums
1997 greatest hits albums
Warner Records compilation albums